Stephen Thomas "Staff" Jones, (born 4 January 1959) is a former Wales rugby union international from Ynysybwl. A Loosehead prop forward product of Ynysybwl RFC, he briefly played for Pontypridd RFC before making 408 appearances for Pontypool RFC in their glory years in the 1980s, often in partnership with Steve Jones and Graham Price to form another formidable front row partnership coached by Ray Prosser.

Staff Jones scored a try on his debut for Wales against Scotland at Murryfield in 1983, joining other Pontypool players Bobby Windsor, Terry Cobner and Graham Price who also scored tries on their international debuts.
In 1983 he toured New Zealand with the British Lions and he was also a regular for the Monmouthshire County team.  After recovering from a serious knee injury sustained in 1986, he was part of the Welsh Triple Crown winning side in 1988, most famously giving the then newly capped Jeff Probyn (a renowned scrummager himself) a scrummaging masterclass at Twickenham in an 11–3 victory.

Notes

1959 births
Living people
Barbarian F.C. players
British & Irish Lions rugby union players from Wales
Monmouthshire County RFC players
Pontypool RFC players
Pontypridd RFC players
Rugby union players from Ynysybwl
Rugby union props
Wales international rugby union players
Welsh rugby union players